Megachile crotalariae is a species of bee in the family Megachilidae. It was described by Schwimmer in 1980.

References

Crotalariae
Insects described in 1980